Pullar may refer to:

 David Pullar (born 1959), English footballer
 Dean Pullar (born 1973), Australian diver
 Lucinda Pullar (born 1998), Australian rules footballer and former soccer player
 Geoff Pullar (born 1935), England and Lancashire cricketer
 Philippa Pullar (1935–1997), British author
 Rachel Pullar (born 1977), New Zealand cricketer
 Willie Pullar (1900–1954), Scottish footballer